A list of films produced by the Bollywood film industry based in Mumbai in 1956:

Highest-grossing films
The ten highest-grossing films at the Indian Box Office in 1956:

A-C

D-I

J-P

R-Z

References

External links
 Bollywood films of 1956 at the Internet Movie Database
 Indian Film Songs from the Year 1956 - A look back at 1956 with a special focus on Hindi film songs
Listen to songs from Bollywood films of 1956

1956
Bollywood
Films, Bollywood